George William Allan,  (August 13, 1860 – December 6, 1940), was a Canadian lawyer and politician.

Life and career
Born in Toronto, his father, George William Allan Sr., served in the Senate of Canada for 35 years, including a term as Speaker of the Senate. The younger Allan moved during his adult life to Winnipeg, Manitoba, where he was elected to one term in the House of Commons of Canada in the 1917 election as the Unionist Member of Parliament for Winnipeg South.

Allan's grandfather was William Allan, member of the Home District and Legislative Council of Upper Canada.

Allan was married to Muriel Hester Wragge and had five children:
 Jocelyn Otillie Allan (1897-?)
 Enid Carlyon Allan (1899-?)
 George William Allan (1902-?)
 Arthur Carlyne "Tony" Allan (1907-?)
 Edmund Allan (1913-?)

He died in Victoria in 1940 and was buried in Winnipeg.

References

External links
 
 

1860 births
1940 deaths
Members of the House of Commons of Canada from Manitoba
Unionist Party (Canada) MPs